Gandulla is a surname. Notable people with the surname include:

Arialis Gandulla (born 1995), Cuban sprinter
Bernardo Gandulla (1916–1999), Argentine footballer and manager

See also
Piñuécar-Gandullas, a municipality of the Community of Madrid, Spain